The 2006 Chicago Marathon was the 29th running of the annual marathon race in Chicago, United States and was held on October 22. The elite men's race was won by Kenya's Robert Kipkoech Cheruiyot in a time of 2:07:35 hours and the women's race was won by Ethiopia's Berhane Adere in 2:20:42.

Results

Men

Women

References

Results. Association of Road Racing Statisticians. Retrieved 2020-04-09.

External links 
 Official website

Chicago Marathon
Chicago
2000s in Chicago
2006 in Illinois
Chicago Marathon
Chicago Marathon